The following is a list of the bird species recorded in Rivers State, Nigeria.
The avifauna of Rivers State include a total of 442 species.

This list's taxonomic treatment (designation and sequence of orders, families and species) and nomenclature (common and scientific names) follow the conventions of The Clements Checklist of Birds of the World, 2022 edition. The family accounts at the beginning of each heading reflect this taxonomy, as do the species counts found in each family account.

The following tags have been used to highlight several categories, but not all species fall into one of these categories. Those that do not are commonly occurring native species.

(A) Accidental - a species that rarely or accidentally occurs in Rivers State

Ducks, geese, and waterfowl
Order: AnseriformesFamily: Anatidae

Anatidae includes the ducks and most duck-like waterfowl, such as geese and swans. These birds are adapted to an aquatic existence with webbed feet, flattened bills, and feathers that are excellent at shedding water due to an oily coating.

 White-faced whistling duck, Dendrocygna viduata
 Knob-billed duck, Sarkidiornis melanotos
 Hartlaub's duck, Pteronetta hartlaubii
 Spur-winged goose, 	Plectropterus gambensis
 African pygmy-goose, Nettapus auritus
 Garganey, Spatula querquedula

Guineafowl
Order: GalliformesFamily: Numididae

Guineafowl are a group of African, seed-eating, ground-nesting birds that resemble partridges, but with featherless heads and spangled grey plumage.

Western crested guineafowl, Guttera verreauxi

Pheasants, grouse, and allies
Order: GalliformesFamily: Phasianidae

Phasianidae consists of the pheasants and their allies. These are terrestrial species, variable in size but generally plump, with broad, relatively short wings. Many species are gamebirds or have been domesticated as a food source for humans.

 Latham's francolin, Peliperdix lathami
 Blue quail, Synoicus adansonii
 Double-spurred francolin, Pternistis bicalcaratus
 Scaly francolin, Pternistis squamatus

Grebes
Order: PodicipediformesFamily: Podicipedidae

Grebes are small to medium-large freshwater diving birds. They have lobed toes and are excellent swimmers and divers. However, they have their feet placed far back on the body, making them quite ungainly on land.

Little grebe, Tachybaptus ruficollis

Pigeons and doves
Order: ColumbiformesFamily: Columbidae

Pigeons and doves are stout-bodied birds with short necks and short slender bills with a fleshy cere.

 Speckled pigeon, Columba guinea
 Mourning collared-dove, Streptopelia decipiens
 Red-eyed dove, Streptopelia semitorquata
 Laughing dove, Streptopelia senegalensis
 Black-billed wood-dove, Turtur abyssinicus
 Blue-spotted wood-dove, Turtur afer
 Tambourine dove, Turtur tympanistria
 Blue-headed wood-dove, Turtur brehmeri
 African green-pigeon, Treron calvus

Turacos
Order: MusophagiformesFamily: Musophagidae

The turacos, plantain eaters and go-away-birds make up the bird family Musophagidae. They are medium-sized arboreal birds. The turacos and plantain eaters are brightly coloured, usually in blue, green or purple. The go-away birds are mostly grey and white.

Great blue turaco, Corythaeola cristata
Guinea turaco, Tauraco persa
Yellow-billed turaco, Tauraco macrorhynchus
Western plantain-eater, Crinifer piscator

Cuckoos
Order: CuculiformesFamily: Cuculidae

The family Cuculidae includes cuckoos, roadrunners, coucals and anis. These birds are of variable size with slender bodies, long tails, and strong legs.

 Black-throated coucal, Centropus leucogaster
 Senegal coucal, Centropus senegalensis
 Blue-headed coucal, Centropus monachus
 Black coucal, Centropus grillii
 Blue malkoha, Ceuthmochares aereus
 Great spotted cuckoo, Clamator glandarius
 Levaillant's cuckoo, Clamator levaillantii
 Dideric cuckoo, Chrysococcyx caprius
 Klaas's cuckoo, Chrysococcyx klaas
 African emerald cuckoo, Chrysococcyx cupreus
 Dusky long-tailed cuckoo, Cercococcyx mechowi
 Olive long-tailed cuckoo, Cercococcyx olivinus
 Black cuckoo, Cuculus clamosus
 Red-chested cuckoo, Cuculus solitarius
 Common cuckoo, Cuculus canorus

Nightjars and allies
Order: CaprimulgiformesFamily: Caprimulgidae

Nightjars are medium-sized nocturnal birds that usually nest on the ground. They have long wings, short legs and very short bills. Most have small feet, of little use for walking, and long pointed wings. Their soft plumage is camouflaged to resemble bark or leaves.

Pennant-winged nightjar, Caprimulgus vexillarius
Standard-winged nightjar, Caprimulgus longipennis
Eurasian nightjar, Caprimulgus europaeus
Fiery-necked nightjar, Caprimulgus pectoralis
Swamp nightjar, Caprimulgus natalensis
Plain nightjar, Caprimulgus inornatus
Long-tailed nightjar, Caprimulgus climacurus

Swifts
Order: CaprimulgiformesFamily: Apodidae

Swifts are small birds which spend the majority of their lives flying. These birds have very short legs and never settle voluntarily on the ground, perching instead only on vertical surfaces. Many swifts have long swept-back wings which resemble a crescent or boomerang.

 Mottled spinetail, Telacanthura ussheri
 Sabine's spinetail, Rhaphidura sabini
 Cassin's spinetail, Neafrapus cassini
 Common swift, Apus apus
 Pallid swift, Apus pallidus
 Little swift, Apus affinis
 White-rumped swift, Apus caffer
 African palm-swift, Cypsiurus parvus

Flufftails
Order: GruiformesFamily: Sarothruridae

The flufftails are a small family of ground-dwelling birds found only in Madagascar and sub-Saharan Africa.

White-spotted flufftail, Sarothrura pulchra

Rails, gallinules, and coots
Order: GruiformesFamily: Rallidae

Rallidae is a large family of small to medium-sized birds which includes the rails, crakes, coots and gallinules. The most typical family members occupy dense vegetation in damp environments near lakes, swamps or rivers. In general they are shy and secretive birds, making them difficult to observe. Most species have strong legs and long toes which are well adapted to soft uneven surfaces. They tend to have short, rounded wings and to be weak fliers.

 African crake, 	Crex egregia
 Gray-throated rail, Canirallus oculeus
 Lesser moorhen, Paragallinula angulata
 Eurasian moorhen, Gallinula chloropus
 Allen's gallinule, Porphyrio alleni
 Nkulengu rail, Himantornis haematopus
 Black crake, Zapornia flavirostra

Finfoots
Order: GruiformesFamily: Heliornithidae

Heliornithidae is a small family of tropical birds with webbed lobes on their feet similar to those of grebes and coots.

African finfoot, Podica senegalensis

Thick-knees
Order: CharadriiformesFamily: Burhinidae

The thick-knees and stone-curlews are a group of largely tropical waders in the family Burhinidae. They are medium to large waders with strong black or yellow-black bills, large yellow eyes, and cryptic plumage. Despite being classed as waders, most species have a preference for arid or semi-arid habitats.

 Water thick-knee, Burhinus vermiculatus
 Senegal thick-knee, Burhinus senegalensis

Egyptian plover
Order: CharadriiformesFamily: Pluvianidae

The Egyptian plover is found across equatorial Africa and along the Nile River.

Egyptian plover, Pluvianus aegyptius

Stilts and avocets
Order: CharadriiformesFamily: Recurvirostridae

Recurvirostridae is a family of large wading birds, which includes the avocets and stilts. The avocets have long legs and long up-curved bills. The stilts have extremely long legs and long, thin, straight bills.

Black-winged stilt, Himantopus himantopus

Oystercatchers
Order: CharadriiformesFamily: Haematopodidae

The oystercatchers are large and noisy plover-like birds, with strong bills used for smashing or prising open molluscs.

Eurasian oystercatcher, Haematopus ostralegus

Plovers and lapwings
Order: CharadriiformesFamily: Charadriidae

The family Charadriidae includes the plovers, dotterels and lapwings. They are small to medium-sized birds with compact bodies, short, thick necks and long, usually pointed, wings. They are found in open country worldwide, mostly in habitats near water.

Black-bellied plover, Pluvialis squatarola
Spur-winged lapwing, Vanellus spinosus
White-headed lapwing, Vanellus albiceps
Brown-chested lapwing, Vanellus superciliosus
Kittlitz's plover, Charadrius pecuarius
Common ringed plover, Charadrius hiaticula
Little ringed plover, Charadrius dubius
Forbes's plover, Charadrius forbesi
White-fronted plover, Charadrius marginatus

Jacanas
Order: CharadriiformesFamily: Jacanidae

The jacanas are a group of tropical waders in the family Jacanidae. They are found throughout the tropics. They are identifiable by their huge feet and claws which enable them to walk on floating vegetation in the shallow lakes that are their preferred habitat.

African jacana, Actophilornis africanus

Sandpipers and allies
Order: CharadriiformesFamily: Scolopacidae

Scolopacidae is a large diverse family of small to medium-sized shorebirds including the sandpipers, curlews, godwits, shanks, tattlers, woodcocks, snipes, dowitchers, and phalaropes. The majority of these species eat small invertebrates picked out of the mud or soil. Variation in length of legs and bills enables multiple species to feed in the same habitat, particularly on the coast, without direct competition for food.

 Whimbrel, Numenius phaeopus
 Eurasian curlew, Numenius arquata
 Bar-tailed godwit, Limosa lapponica
 Black-tailed godwit, Limosa limosa
 Ruddy turnstone, Arenaria interpres
 Red knot, Calidris canutus
 Curlew sandpiper, Calidris ferruginea
 Sanderling, Calidris alba
 Little stint, Calidris minuta
 Jack snipe, Lymnocryptes minimus
 Great snipe, Gallinago media
 Common snipe, Gallinago gallinago
 Common sandpiper, Actitis hypoleucos
 Green sandpiper, Tringa ochropus
 Spotted redshank, Tringa erythropus
 Common greenshank, 	Tringa nebularia
 Marsh sandpiper, Tringa stagnatilis
 Wood sandpiper, Tringa glareola
 Common redshank, Tringa totanus

Buttonquails
Order: CharadriiformesFamily: Turnicidae

The buttonquails are small, drab, running birds which resemble the true quails. The female is the brighter of the sexes and initiates courtship. The male incubates the eggs and tends the young.

Small buttonquail, Turnix sylvatica

Pratincoles and coursers
Order: CharadriiformesFamily: Glareolidae

Glareolidae is a family of wading birds comprising the pratincoles, which have short legs, long pointed wings and long forked tails, and the coursers, which have long legs, short wings and long, pointed bills which curve downwards.

Temminck's courser, Cursorius temminckii
Collared pratincole, Glareola pratincola
Rock pratincole, Glareola nuchalis
Gray pratincole, Glareola cinerea

Gulls, terns, and skimmers
Order: CharadriiformesFamily: Laridae

Laridae is a family of medium to large seabirds, the gulls, terns, and skimmers. Gulls are typically grey or white, often with black markings on the head or wings. They have stout, longish bills and webbed feet. Terns are a group of generally medium to large seabirds typically with grey or white plumage, often with black markings on the head. Most terns hunt fish by diving but some pick insects off the surface of fresh water. Terns are generally long-lived birds, with several species known to live in excess of 30 years. Skimmers are a small family of tropical tern-like birds. They have an elongated lower mandible which they use to feed by flying low over the water surface and skimming the water for small fish.

Gray-hooded gull, Chroicocephalus cirrocephalus
Lesser black-backed gull, Larus fuscus
Brown noddy, Anous stolidus
Black noddy, Anous minutus
Sooty tern, Onychoprion fuscatus
Bridled tern, Onychoprion anaethetus
Little tern, Sternula albifrons
Damara tern, Sternula balaenarum
Gull-billed tern, Gelochelidon nilotica
Caspian tern, Hydroprogne caspia
Black tern, Chlidonias niger
White-winged tern, Chlidonias leucopterus
Whiskered tern, Chlidonias hybrida
Common tern, Sterna hirundo
Arctic tern, Sterna paradisaea
Sandwich tern, Thalasseus sandvicensis
West African crested tern, Thalasseus albididorsalis
African skimmer, Rynchops flavirostris

Tropicbirds
Order: PhaethontiformesFamily: Phaethontidae

Tropicbirds are slender white birds of tropical oceans, with exceptionally long central tail feathers. Their heads and long wings have black markings.

White-tailed tropicbird, Phaethon lepturus
Red-billed tropicbird, Phaethon aethereus

Shearwaters and petrels
Order: ProcellariiformesFamily: Procellariidae

The procellariids are the main group of medium-sized "true petrels", characterised by united nostrils with medium septum and a long outer functional primary.

Sooty shearwater, Ardenna griseus (A)

Storks
Order: CiconiiformesFamily: Ciconiidae

Storks are large, long-legged, long-necked, wading birds with long, stout bills. Storks are mute, but bill-clattering is an important mode of communication at the nest. Their nests can be large and may be reused for many years. Many species are migratory.

African woolly-necked stork, Ciconia microscelis
Yellow-billed stork, Mycteria ibis

Boobies and gannets
Order: SuliformesFamily: Sulidae

The sulids comprise the gannets and boobies. Both groups are medium to large coastal seabirds that plunge-dive for fish.

Brown booby, Sula leucogaster
Cape gannet, Morus capensis

Anhingas
Order: SuliformesFamily: Anhingidae

Darters are often called "snake-birds" because of their long thin neck, which gives a snake-like appearance when they swim with their bodies submerged. The males have black and dark-brown plumage, an erectile crest on the nape and a larger bill than the female. The females have much paler plumage especially on the neck and underparts. The darters have completely webbed feet and their legs are short and set far back on the body. Their plumage is somewhat permeable, like that of cormorants, and they spread their wings to dry after diving.

African darter, Anhinga melanogaster

Cormorants and shags
Order: SuliformesFamily: Phalacrocoracidae

Phalacrocoracidae is a family of medium to large coastal, fish-eating seabirds that includes cormorants and shags. Plumage colouration varies, with the majority having mainly dark plumage, some species being black-and-white and a few being colourful.

Long-tailed cormorant, Microcarbo africanus

Pelicans
Order: PelecaniformesFamily: Pelecanidae

Pelicans are large water birds with a distinctive pouch under their beak. As with other members of the order Pelecaniformes, they have webbed feet with four toes.

Pink-backed pelican, Pelecanus rufescens

Hammerkop
Order: PelecaniformesFamily: Scopidae

The hammerkop is a medium-sized bird with a long shaggy crest. The shape of its head with a curved bill and crest at the back is reminiscent of a hammer, hence its name. Its plumage is drab-brown all over.

Hamerkop, Scopus umbretta

Herons, egrets, and bitterns
Order: PelecaniformesFamily: Ardeidae

The family Ardeidae contains the herons, egrets, and bitterns. Herons and egrets are medium to large wading birds with long necks and legs. Bitterns tend to be shorter necked and more secretive. Members of Ardeidae fly with their necks retracted, unlike other long-necked birds such as storks, ibises, and spoonbills.

 Little bittern, Ixobrychus minutus
 Dwarf bittern, 	Ixobrychus sturmii
 White-crested bittern, Tigriornis leucolopha
 Gray heron, Ardea cinerea
 Black-headed heron, Ardea melanocephala
 Goliath heron, Ardea goliath
 Purple heron, Ardea purpurea
 Great egret, Ardea alba
 Intermediate egret, Ardea intermedia
 Little egret, Egretta garzetta
 Western reef-heron, Egretta gularis
 Cattle egret, Bubulcus ibis
 Squacco heron, Ardeola ralloides
 Striated heron, Butorides striata
 Black-crowned night-heron, Nycticorax nycticorax
 White-backed night-heron, Gorsachius leuconotus

Ibises and spoonbills
Order: PelecaniformesFamily: Threskiornithidae

Threskiornithidae is a family of large terrestrial and wading birds which includes the ibises and spoonbills. They have long, broad wings with 11 primary and about 20 secondary feathers. They are strong fliers and despite their size and weight, very capable soarers.

African sacred ibis, Threskiornis aethiopicus
Hadada ibis, Bostrychia hagedash
African spoonbill, Platalea alba

Hawks, eagles, and kites
Order: AccipitriformesFamily: Accipitridae

Accipitridae is a family of birds of prey which includes hawks, eagles, kites, harriers, and Old World vultures. These birds have powerful hooked beaks for tearing flesh from their prey, strong legs, powerful talons, and keen eyesight.

 Black-winged kite, Elanus caeruleus
 African harrier-hawk, Polyboroides typus
 Palm-nut vulture, Gypohierax angolensis
 European honey-buzzard, Pernis apivorus
 African cuckoo-hawk, Aviceda cuculoides
 Hooded vulture, Necrosyrtes monachus
 Congo serpent-eagle, Circaetus spectabilis 
 Bat hawk, Macheiramphus alcinus
 Crowned eagle, Stephanoaetus coronatus
 Martial eagle, Polemaetus bellicosus
 Long-crested eagle, Lophaetus occipitalis
 Tawny eagle, Aquila rapax
 Cassin's hawk-eagle, Aquila africana
 Lizard buzzard, Kaupifalco monogrammicus
 Gabar goshawk, 	Micronisus gabar
 Eurasian marsh-harrier, Circus aeruginosus
 Montagu's harrier, Circus pygargus
African goshawk, Accipiter tachiro
 Chestnut-flanked sparrowhawk, Accipiter castanilius
 Shikra, Accipiter badius
 Red-thighed sparrowhawk, Accipiter erythropus
 Black goshawk, Accipiter melanoleucus
 Long-tailed hawk, Urotriorchis macrourus
 Black kite, Milvus migrans
 African fish-eagle, Haliaeetus vocifer
 Red-necked buzzard, Buteo auguralis

Barn-owls
Order: StrigiformesFamily: Tytonidae

Barn-owls are medium to large owls with large heads and characteristic heart-shaped faces. They have long strong legs with powerful talons.

Barn owl, Tyto alba

Owls
Order: StrigiformesFamily: Strigidae

The typical owls are small to large solitary nocturnal birds of prey. They have large forward-facing eyes and ears, a hawk-like beak and a conspicuous circle of feathers around each eye called a facial disk.

Eurasian scops-owl, Otus scops
Northern white-faced owl, Ptilopsis leucotis
Grayish eagle-owl, Bubo cinerascens
Fraser's eagle-owl, Bubo poensis
Akun eagle-owl, Bubo leucostictus
Pel's fishing-owl, Scotopelia peli
Vermiculated fishing-owl, Scotopelia bouvieri
Sjöstedt's owlet, Glaucidium sjostedti
African wood-owl, Strix woodfordii

Trogons
Order: TrogoniformesFamily: Trogonidae

The family Trogonidae includes trogons and quetzals. Found in tropical woodlands worldwide, they feed on insects and fruit, and their broad bills and weak legs reflect their diet and arboreal habits. Although their flight is fast, they are reluctant to fly any distance. Trogons have soft, often colourful, feathers with distinctive male and female plumage.

Narina trogon, Apaloderma narina

Hoopoes
Order: BucerotiformesFamily: Upupidae

Hoopoes have black, white and orangey-pink colouring with a large erectile crest on their head.

Eurasian hoopoe, Upupa epops

Woodhoopoes
Order: BucerotiformesFamily: Phoeniculidae

The woodhoopoes are related to the kingfishers, rollers and hoopoes. They most resemble the hoopoes with their long curved bills, used to probe for insects, and short rounded wings. However, they differ in that they have metallic plumage, often blue, green or purple, and lack an erectile crest.

White-headed woodhoopoe, Phoeniculus bollei
Forest woodhoopoe, Phoeniculus castaneiceps

Hornbills
Order: BucerotiformesFamily: Bucerotidae

Hornbills are a group of birds whose bill is shaped like a cow's horn, but without a twist, sometimes with a casque on the upper mandible. Frequently, the bill is brightly colored.

 Red-billed dwarf hornbill, Lophoceros camurus
 African pied hornbill, Tockus fasciatus
 White-crested hornbill, Horizocerus albocristatus
 Black dwarf hornbill, Horizocerus hartlaubi
 Black-casqued hornbill, Ceratogymna atrata
 Piping hornbill, Bycanistes fistulator

Kingfishers
Order: CoraciiformesFamily: Alcedinidae

Kingfishers are medium-sized birds with large heads, long, pointed bills, short legs, and stubby tails.

 Shining-blue kingfisher, Alcedo quadribrachys
 Malachite kingfisher, Corythornis cristatus
 White-bellied kingfisher, Corythornis leucogaster
 African pygmy kingfisher, Ispidina picta
 Chocolate-backed kingfisher, Halcyon badia
 Gray-headed kingfisher, Halcyon leucocephala
 Woodland kingfisher, Halcyon senegalensis
 Blue-breasted kingfisher, Halcyon malimbica
 Giant kingfisher, Megaceryle maxima Pied kingfisher, Ceryle rudis

Bee-eatersOrder: CoraciiformesFamily: Meropidae

The bee-eaters are a group of near passerine birds in the family Meropidae. Most species are found in Africa but others occur in southern Europe, Madagascar, Australia and New Guinea. They are characterised by richly coloured plumage, slender bodies and usually elongated central tail feathers. All are colourful and have long downturned bills and pointed wings, which give them a swallow-like appearance when seen from afar.

Black bee-eater, Merops gularis
Blue-moustached bee-eater, Merops mentalis
Red-throated bee-eater, Merops bulocki
Little bee-eater, Merops pusillus
White-throated bee-eater, Merops albicollis
Rosy bee-eater, Merops malimbicus

RollersOrder: CoraciiformesFamily: Coraciidae

Rollers resemble crows in size and build, but are more closely related to the kingfishers and bee-eaters. They share the colourful appearance of those groups with blues and browns predominating. The two inner front toes are connected, but the outer toe is not.

Abyssinian roller, Coracias abyssinica
Broad-billed roller, Eurystomus glaucurus
Blue-throated roller, Eurystomus gularis

African barbetsOrder: PiciformesFamily: Lybiidae

The barbets are plump birds, with short necks and large heads. They get their name from the bristles which fringe their heavy bills. Most species are brightly coloured.

Yellow-billed barbet, Trachyphonus purpuratus
Bristle-nosed barbet, Gymnobucco peli
Naked-faced barbet, Gymnobucco calvus
Speckled tinkerbird, Pogoniulus scolopaceus
Red-rumped tinkerbird, Pogoniulus atroflavus
Yellow-throated tinkerbird, Pogoniulus subsulphureus
Yellow-rumped tinkerbird, Pogoniulus bilineatus
Yellow-spotted barbet, Buccanodon duchaillui
Hairy-breasted barbet, Tricholaema hirsuta
Vieillot's barbet, Lybius vieilloti

HoneyguidesOrder: PiciformesFamily: Indicatoridae

Honeyguides are among the few birds that feed on wax. They are named for the greater honeyguide which leads traditional honey-hunters to bees' nests and, after the hunters have harvested the honey, feeds on the remaining contents of the hive.

 Cassin's honeyguide, Prodotiscus insignis
 Willcocks's honeyguide, Indicator willcocksi
 Least honeyguide, Indicator exilis
 Spotted honeyguide, Indicator maculatus
 Lyre-tailed honeyguide, Melichneutes robustus

WoodpeckersOrder: PiciformesFamily: Picidae

Woodpeckers are small to medium-sized birds with chisel-like beaks, short legs, stiff tails, and long tongues used for capturing insects. Some species have feet with two toes pointing forward and two backward, while several species have only three toes. Many woodpeckers have the habit of tapping noisily on tree trunks with their beaks.

 Gabon woodpecker, Chloropicus gabonensis
 Cardinal woodpecker, Chloropicus fuscescens
 Fire-bellied woodpecker, Chloropicus pyrrhogaster
 Golden-crowned woodpecker, Chloropicus xantholophus
 African gray woodpecker, Chloropicus goertae
 Buff-spotted woodpecker, Campethera nivosa
 Green-backed woodpecker, Campethera cailliautii

Falcons and caracarasOrder: FalconiformesFamily: Falconidae

Falconidae is a family of diurnal birds of prey. They differ from hawks, eagles and kites in that they kill with their beaks instead of their talons.

Eurasian kestrel, Falco tinnunculus
Gray kestrel, Falco ardosiaceus
African hobby, Falco cuvierii
Lanner falcon, Falco biarmicus

Old World parrotsOrder: PsittaciformesFamily: Psittaculidae

Characteristic features of parrots include a strong curved bill, an upright stance, strong legs, and clawed zygodactyl feet. Many parrots are vividly coloured, and some are multi-coloured. Old World parrots are found from Africa east across south and southeast Asia and Oceania to Australia and New Zealand.

Rose-ringed parakeet, Psittacula krameri
Red-headed lovebird, Agapornis pullarius

New World and African parrotsOrder: PsittaciformesFamily: Psittacidae

Parrots are small to large birds with a characteristic curved beak. Their upper mandibles have slight mobility in the joint with the skull and they have a generally erect stance. All parrots are zygodactyl, having the four toes on each foot placed two at the front and two to the back.

 Gray parrot, Psittacus erithacus
 Senegal parrot, Poicephalus senegalus

African and green broadbillsOrder: PasseriformesFamily: Calyptomenidae

The broadbills are small, brightly coloured birds, which feed on fruit and also take insects in flycatcher fashion, snapping their broad bills.

Rufous-sided broadbill, Smithornis rufolateralis

CuckooshrikesOrder: PasseriformesFamily: Campephagidae

The cuckooshrikes are small to medium-sized passerine birds. They are predominantly greyish with white and black, although some species are brightly colored.

 Blue cukooshrike, Coracina azurea

Old World oriolesOrder: PasseriformesFamily: Oriolidae

The Old World orioles are colourful passerine birds. They are not related to the New World orioles.

Eurasian golden oriole, Oriolus oriolus
African golden oriole, Oriolus auratus
Western black-headed oriole, Oriolus brachyrynchus
Black-winged oriole, Oriolus nigripennis

Wattle-eyes and batisesOrder: PasseriformesFamily: Platysteiridae

The wattle-eyes, or puffback flycatchers, are small stout passerine birds of the African tropics. They get their name from the brightly coloured fleshy eye decorations found in most species in this group.

 Brown-throated wattle-eye, Platysteira cyanea
 Chestnut wattle-eye, Platysteira castanea
 White-spotted wattle-eye, Platysteira tonsa
 Red-cheeked wattle-eye, Platysteira blissetti
 Yellow-bellied wattle-eye, Platysteira concreta

Vangas, helmetshrikes, and alliesOrder: PasseriformesFamily: Vangidae

The helmetshrikes are similar in build to the shrikes, but tend to be colourful species with distinctive crests or other head ornaments, such as wattles, from which they get their name.

 Red-billed helmetshrike, Prionops caniceps
 African shrike-flycatcher, Megabyas flammulatus
 Black-and-white shrike-flycatcher, Bias musicus

Bushshrikes and alliesOrder: PasseriformesFamily: Malaconotidae

Bushshrikes are similar in habits to shrikes, hunting insects and other small prey from a perch on a bush. Although similar in build to the shrikes, these tend to be either colourful species or largely black; some species are quite secretive.

 Northern puffback, Dryoscopus gambensis
 Sabine's puffback, Dryoscopus sabini
 Black-crowned tchagra, Tchagra senegalus
 Brown-crowned tchagra, Tchagra australis
 Tropical boubou, Laniarius major
 Many-colored bushshrike, Telophorus multicolor
 Fiery-breasted bushshrike, Malaconotus cruentus

DrongosOrder: PasseriformesFamily: Dicruridae

The drongos are mostly black or dark grey in colour, sometimes with metallic tints. They have long forked tails, and some species have elaborate tail decorations. They have short legs and sit very upright when perched, like a shrike. They flycatch or take prey from the ground.

Shining drongo, Dicrurus atripennis

Monarch flycatchersOrder: PasseriformesFamily: Monarchidae

The monarch flycatchers are small to medium-sized insectivorous passerines which hunt by flycatching.

Blue-headed crested-flycatcher, Trochocercus nitens
Black-headed paradise-flycatcher, Terpsiphone rufiventer
African paradise-flycatcher, Terpsiphone viridis

ShrikesOrder: PasseriformesFamily: Laniidae

Shrikes are passerine birds known for their habit of catching other birds and small animals and impaling the uneaten portions of their bodies on thorns. A shrike's beak is hooked, like that of a typical bird of prey.

 Northern fiscal, Lanius humeralis

Crows, jays, and magpiesOrder: PasseriformesFamily: Corvidae

The family Corvidae includes crows, ravens, jays, choughs, magpies, treepies, nutcrackers, and ground jays. Corvids are above average in size among the Passeriformes, and some of the larger species show high levels of intelligence.

 Piapiac, Ptilostomus afer
 Pied crow, Corvus albus

Fairy flycatchersOrder: PasseriformesFamily: Stenostiridae

Most of the species of this small family are found in Africa, though a few inhabit tropical Asia. They are not closely related to other birds called "flycatchers".

 Dusky crested flycatcher, Elminia nigromitrata

Penduline-titsOrder: PasseriformesFamily: Remizidae

The penduline-tits are a group of small passerine birds related to the true tits. They are insectivores.

Forest penduline-tit, Anthoscopus flavifrons

NicatorsOrder: PasseriformesFamily: Nicatoridae

The nicators are shrike-like, with hooked bills. They are endemic to sub-Saharan Africa.

Western nicator, Nicator chloris

African warblersOrder: PasseriformesFamily: Macrosphenidae

African warblers are small to medium-sized insectivores which are found in a wide variety of habitats south of the Sahara.

Green crombec, Sylvietta virens
Northern crombec, Sylvietta brachyura
Moustached grass-warbler, Melocichla mentalis
Kemp's longbill, Macrosphenus kempi
Gray longbill, Macrosphenus concolor
Green hylia, Hylia prasina
Tit-hylia, Pholidornis rushiae

Cisticolas and alliesOrder: PasseriformesFamily: Cisticolidae

The Cisticolidae are warblers found mainly in warmer southern regions of the Old World. They are generally very small birds of drab brown or grey appearance found in open country such as grassland or scrub.

 Rufous-crowned eremomela, Eremomela badiceps
 Green-backed camaroptera, Camaroptera brachyura
 Yellow-browed camaroptera, 	Camaroptera superciliaris
 Olive-green camaroptera, Camaroptera chloronota
 Black-capped apalis, Apalis nigriceps
 Yellow-breasted apalis, Apalis flavida
 Buff-throated apalis, Apalis rufogularis
 Tawny-flanked prinia, Prinia subflava
 Red-faced cisticola, Cisticola erythrops
 Singing cisticola, Cisticola cantans
 Chattering cisticola, Cisticola anonymus
 Winding cisticola, Cisticola marginatus
 Siffling cisticola, Cisticola brachypterus

Reed warblers and alliesOrder: PasseriformesFamily: Acrocephalidae

The reed-warblers or acrocephalid warblers are a family of oscine passerine birds, in the superfamily Sylvioidea. The species in this family are usually rather large " warblers". Most are rather plain olivaceous brown above with much yellow to beige below. They are usually found in open woodland, reedbeds, or tall grass.

 Eastern olivaceous warbler, Iduna pallida
 Western olivaceous warbler, Iduna opaca
 Melodious warbler, Hippolais polyglotta
 Sedge warbler, Acrocephalus schoenobaenus
 Eurasian reed warbler, Acrocephalus scirpaceus
 Greater swamp warbler, Acrocephalus rufescens
 Great reed warbler, Acrocephalus arundinaceus

SwallowsOrder: PasseriformesFamily: Hirundinidae

The family Hirundinidae is adapted to aerial feeding. They have a slender streamlined body, long pointed wings and a short bill with a wide gape. The feet are adapted to perching rather than walking, and the front toes are partially joined at the base.

Plain martin, Riparia paludicola
Bank swallow, Riparia riparia
Banded martin, Riparia cincta
Barn swallow, Hirundo rustica
Ethiopian swallow, Hirundo aethiopica
White-throated blue swallow, Hirundo nigrita
Wire-tailed swallow, Hirundo smithii
Lesser striped swallow, Cecropis abyssinica
Rufous-chested swallow, Cecropis semirufa
Preuss's swallow, Petrochelidon preussi
Common house-martin, Delichon urbicum
Square-tailed sawwing, Psalidoprocne nitens
Black sawwing, Psalidoprocne pristoptera
Fanti sawwing, Psalidoprocne obscura

BulbulsOrder: PasseriformesFamily: Pycnonotidae

Bulbuls are medium-sized songbirds. Some are colourful with yellow, red or orange vents, cheeks, throats or supercilia, but most are drab, with uniform olive-brown to black plumage. Some species have distinct crests.

 Slender-billed greenbul, Stelgidillas gracilirostris
 Golden greenbul, Calyptocichla serinus
 Red-tailed bristlebill, Bleda syndactylus
 Gray-headed bristlebill, Bleda canicapillus
 Simple greenbul, Chlorocichla simplex
 Honeyguide greenbul, Baeopogon indicator
 Spotted greenbul, Ixonotus guttatus
 Swamp greenbul, Thescelocichla leucopleura
 Red-tailed greenbul, Criniger calurus
 Western bearded-greenbul, Criniger barbatus
 Gray greenbul, Eurillas gracilis
 Ansorge's greenbul, Eurillas ansorgei
 Plain greenbul, Eurillas curvirostris
 Yellow-whiskered greenbul, Eurillas latirostris
 Little greenbul, Eurillas virens
 Leaf-love, Phyllastrephus scandens
 Icterine greenbul, Phyllastrephus icterinus
 White-throated greenbul, Phyllastrephus albigularis
 Common bulbul, Pycnonotus barbatus

Leaf warblersOrder: PasseriformesFamily: Phylloscopidae

Leaf warblers are a family of small insectivorous birds found mostly in Eurasia and ranging into Wallacea and Africa. The species are of various sizes, often green-plumaged above and yellow below, or more subdued with greyish-green to greyish-brown colours.

Wood warbler, Phylloscopus sibilatrix
Willow warbler, Phylloscopus trochilus

Bush warblers and alliesOrder: PasseriformesFamily: Scotocercidae

The members of this family are found throughout Africa, Asia, and Polynesia. Their taxonomy is in flux, and some authorities place genus Erythrocerus in another family.

Chestnut-capped flycatcher, Erythrocercus mccallii

Sylviid warblers, parrotbills, and allies Order: PasseriformesFamily: Sylviidae

The family Sylviidae is a group of small insectivorous passerine birds. They mainly occur as breeding species, as the common name implies, in Europe, Asia and, to a lesser extent, Africa. Most are of generally undistinguished appearance, but many have distinctive songs.

Eurasian blackcap, Sylvia atricapilla
Garden warbler, Sylvia borin

White-eyes, yuhinas, and alliesOrder: PasseriformesFamily: Zosteropidae

The white-eyes are small and mostly undistinguished, their plumage above being generally some dull colour like greenish-olive, but some species have a white or bright yellow throat, breast or lower parts, and several have buff flanks. As their name suggests, many species have a white ring around each eye.

Forest white-eye, Zosterops stenocricotus

Ground babblers and alliesOrder: PasseriformesFamily: Pellorneidae

These small to medium-sized songbirds have soft fluffy plumage but are otherwise rather diverse. Members of the genus Illadopsis are found in forests, but some other genera are birds of scrublands

Brown illadopsis, Illadopsis fulvescens
Pale-breasted illadopsis, Illadopsis rufipennis
Blackcap illadopsis, Illadopsis cleaveri
Puvel's illadopsis, Illadopsis puveli

OxpeckersOrder: PasseriformesFamily: Buphagidae

As both the English and scientific names of these birds imply, they feed on ectoparasites, primarily ticks, found on large mammals.

Yellow-billed oxpecker, Buphagus africanus

StarlingsOrder: PasseriformesFamily: Sturnidae

Starlings are small to medium-sized passerine birds. They are medium-sized passerines with strong feet. Their flight is strong and direct and they are very gregarious. Their preferred habitat is fairly open country, and they eat insects and fruit. Plumage is typically dark with a metallic sheen.

 Violet-backed starling, Cinnyricinclus leucogaster
 Chestnut-winged starling, Onychognathus fulgidus
 Purple-headed starling, Hylopsar purpureiceps
 Long-tailed glossy starling, Lamprotornis caudatus
 Splendid starling, Lamprotornis splendidus
 Chestnut-bellied starling, Lamprotornis pulcher
 Purple starling, Lamprotornis purpureus

Thrushes and alliesOrder: PasseriformesFamily: Turdidae

The thrushes are a group of passerine birds that occur mainly but not exclusively in the Old World. They are plump, soft plumaged, small to medium-sized insectivores or sometimes omnivores, often feeding on the ground. Many have attractive songs.

 Rufous flycatcher-thrush, Neocossyphus fraseri
 White-tailed ant-thrush, Neocossyphus poensis
 African thrush, Turdus pelios

Old World flycatchersOrder: PasseriformesFamily: Muscicapidae

Old World flycatchers are a large group of small passerine birds native to the Old World. They are mainly small arboreal insectivores. The appearance of these birds is highly varied, but they mostly have weak songs and harsh calls.

 Spotted flycatcher, Muscicapa striata
 Cassin's flycatcher, Muscicapa cassini
 Sooty flycatcher, Bradornis fuliginosus
 Dusky-blue flycatcher, Bradornis comitatus
 Pale flycatcher, Agricola pallidus
 White-browed forest-flycatcher, Fraseria cinerascens
 African forest-flycatcher, Fraseria ocreata
 Gray-throated tit-flycatcher, Fraseria griseigularis
 Gray tit-flycatcher, Fraseria plumbea
 Olivaceous flycatcher, Fraseria olivascens
 Fire-crested alethe, Alethe castanea
 Blue-shouldered robin-chat, Cossypha cyanocampter
 Snowy-crowned robin-chat, Cossypha niveicapilla
 Brown-chested alethe, Chamaetylas poliocephala
Orange-breasted forest robin, Stiphrornis erythrothorax
 Common nightingale, Luscinia megarhynchos
 European pied flycatcher, Ficedula hypoleuca
 Whinchat, Saxicola rubetra
 White-fronted black-chat, Oenanthe albifrons

Sunbirds and spiderhuntersOrder: PasseriformesFamily: Nectariniidae

The sunbirds and spiderhunters are very small passerine birds which feed largely on nectar, although they will also take insects, especially when feeding young. Flight is fast and direct on their short wings. Most species can take nectar by hovering like a hummingbird, but usually perch to feed.

 Fraser's sunbird, Deleornis fraseri
 Mouse-brown sunbird, Anthreptes gabonicus
 Little green sunbird, Anthreptes seimundi
 Green sunbird, Anthreptes rectirostris
 Collared sunbird, Hedydipna collaris
 Reichenbach's sunbird, Anabathmis reichenbachii
 Green-headed sunbird, Cyanomitra verticalis
 Blue-throated brown sunbird, Cyanomitra cyanolaema
 Olive sunbird, Cyanomitra olivacea
 Buff-throated sunbird, Chalcomitra adelberti
 Carmelite sunbird, Chalcomitra fuliginosa
 Olive-bellied sunbird, Cinnyris chloropygius
 Tiny sunbird, Cinnyris minullus
 Splendid sunbird, Cinnyris coccinigastrus
 Superb sunbird, Cinnyris superbus
 Variable sunbird, Cinnyris venustus
 Bates's sunbird, Cinnyris batesi
 Copper sunbird, Cinnyris cupreus

Weavers and alliesOrder: PasseriformesFamily: Ploceidae

Weavers are a group of small passerine birds related to the finches. These are seed-eating birds with rounded conical bills, most of which breed in sub-Saharan Africa, with fewer species in tropical Asia. Weavers get their name from the large woven nests many species make. They are gregarious birds which often breed colonially.

 Red-vented malimbe, Malimbus scutatus
 Red-bellied malimbe, Malimbus erythrogaster
 Blue-billed malimbe, Malimbus nitens
 Crested malimbe, Malimbus malimbicus
 Red-headed malimbe, Malimbus rubricollis
 Slender-billed weaver, Ploceus pelzelni
 Black-necked weaver, Ploceus nigricollis
 Orange weaver, Ploceus aurantius
 Heuglin's masked-weaver, Ploceus heuglini
 Vieillot's black weaver, Ploceus nigerrimus
 Village weaver, Ploceus cucullatus
 Black-headed weaver, Ploceus melanocephalus
 Yellow-mantled weaver, Ploceus tricolor
 Red-headed quelea, Quelea erythrops
 Northern red bishop, Euplectes franciscanus
 Black-winged bishop, Euplectes hordeaceus
 Yellow-crowned bishop, Euplectes afer
 Yellow-mantled widowbird, Euplectes macroura
 Grosbeak weaver, Amblyospiza albifrons

Waxbills and alliesOrder: PasseriformesFamily: Estrildidae

The estrildid finches can be classified as the family Estrildidae (waxbills, munias, and allies), or as a subfamily within the family Passeridae, which strictly defined comprises the Old World sparrows. They are gregarious and often colonial seed eaters with short thick but pointed bills. They are all similar in structure and habits, but have wide variation in plumage colors and patterns.

 Bronze mannikin, Spermestes cucullata
 Magpie mannikin, Spermestes fringilloides
 Black-and-white mannikin, Spermestes bicolor
 Woodhouse's antpecker, Parmoptila woodhousei
 White-breasted nigrita, Nigrita fusconotus
 Chestnut-breasted nigrita, Nigrita bicolor
 Gray-headed nigrita, Nigrita canicapillus
 Pale-fronted nigrita, Nigrita luteifrons
 Orange-cheeked waxbill, Estrilda melpoda
 Anambra waxbill, Estrilda poliopareia
 Common waxbill, Estrilda astrild
 Western bluebill, Spermophaga haematina
 Black-bellied seedcracker, Pyrenestes ostrinus
 Red-billed firefinch, Lagonosticta senegala
 African firefinch, Lagonosticta rubricata
 Bar-breasted firefinch, Lagonosticta rufopicta

IndigobirdsOrder: PasseriformesFamily: Viduidae

The indigobirds are finch-like species which usually have black or indigo predominating in their plumage. All are brood parasites, which lay their eggs in the nests of estrildid finches.

 Pin-tailed whydah, Vidua macroura
 Sahel paradise-whydah, Vidua orientalis
 Wilson's indigobird, Vidua wilsoni
 Cameroon indigobird, Vidua camerunensis

Old World sparrowsOrder: PasseriformesFamily: Passeridae

Old World sparrows are small passerine birds. In general, sparrows tend to be small, plump, brown or grey birds with short tails and short powerful beaks. Sparrows are seed eaters, but they also consume small insects.

Northern gray-headed sparrow, Passer griseus

Wagtails and pipitsOrder: PasseriformesFamily: Motacillidae

Motacillidae is a family of small passerine birds with medium to long tails. They include the wagtails, longclaws and pipits. They are slender, ground feeding insectivores of open country.

Western yellow wagtail, Motacilla flava
African pied wagtail, Motacilla aguimp
Plain-backed pipit, Anthus leucophrys
Tree pipit, Anthus trivialis
Yellow-throated longclaw, Macronyx croceus

 Finches, euphonias, and alliesOrder: PasseriformesFamily''': Fringillidae

Finches are seed-eating passerine birds, that are small to moderately large and have a strong beak, usually conical and in some species very large. All have twelve tail feathers and nine primaries. These birds have a bouncing flight with alternating bouts of flapping and gliding on closed wings, and most sing well.

Yellow-fronted canary, Crithagra mozambica''

See also
 List of birds
 Lists of birds by region
 List of birds of Africa

References

birds
Rivers State